Birgit Penzenstadler (born September 9, 1981 in Erding, Germany) is a German assistant professor of Software Engineering at  Chalmers University of Technology and adjunct docent at Lappeenranta University of Technology. She is well known for her work on environmental sustainability in software engineering and for being one of the founders of the sustainability design initiative, which seeks to advance the research on sustainability in technical disciplines such as computer science and software engineering.

Work

Prior to Chalmers University of Technology, Birgit was a professor at California State University, Long Beach. Also she has completed a postdoctoral fellowship at the University of California, Irvine with Prof. Debra J. Richardson and Prof. Bill Tomlinson. They developed framework called SE4S that supports the infusion of sustainability in the requirements engineering (RE) and quality assurance (QA) stages of software engineering processes.

Penzenstadler coined the term "Software Engineering for Sustainability" in 2013. Also, she is the main organizer of the workshop series “Requirements Engineering for Sustainable Systems” since 2012 at the International Requirements Engineering Conferences. She led the Resilience Lab at California State University, Long Beach during 2015- 2019 which focused on research that evaluated the properties of a software system in relation to sustainability.

References 

Living people
People from Erding (district)
1981 births
California State University, Long Beach faculty
Technical University of Munich alumni
German expatriates in the United States
German software engineers
German women engineers
Software engineering researchers
Sustainability advocates
Engineers from Bavaria